Gustave is a large male Nile crocodile in Burundi who is notorious for being a man-eater, rumored to have killed as many as 200 people on the banks of the Ruzizi River and the northern shores of Lake Tanganyika, between which he roams. Though the actual number of victims is difficult to verify, he has obtained near-mythical status and is greatly feared by people in the region.

Gustave was named by Patrice Faye, a herpetologist who has been studying and investigating him since the late 1990s. Much of what is known about Gustave stems from the film Capturing the Killer Croc, which aired in 2004 on PBS. The film documents a capture attempt and study on Gustave.

Description 
He was estimated to be around 100 years old in order to achieve such outstanding size; however, further more careful observation of Gustave revealed a complete set of teeth when he opened his mouth. Since a 100-year-old crocodile "should be nearly toothless" (according to the documentary), he was estimated to be "probably no older than 60, and likely still growing".

One of Gustave's notable characteristics is the three bullet scars on his body. His right shoulder blade was also found to be deeply wounded. Circumstances surrounding the four scars are unknown. Scientists and herpetologists who have studied Gustave claim that his uncommon size and weight impede his ability to hunt the species' usual agile prey such as fish, antelope and zebra, forcing him to attack larger animals such as hippopotamus, large buffalo and, to some extent, humans. Despite frequently being referred to as a man-eater, a popular local warning says he often leaves his victims' corpses uneaten. The documentary film also stated that since crocodiles can go several months without eating, Gustave can afford to select his prey carefully.

Capture attempt 
In Capturing the Killer Croc, Patrice Faye and other scientists attempted to capture Gustave. According to the film, Faye performed two years of investigations before the attempt. Faye and his team were given two months for their capture attempt; thereafter a change of government would risk plunging the country into civil war. 

A trap cage weighing a tonne and measuring nearly 9 meters (30 feet) in length was developed. The team then located Gustave and installed and baited the trap, placing a hidden infrared camera inside as well. Several kinds of bait were used, yet none of them attracted Gustave or any other creature. The scientists then strategically installed three giant snares on certain banks to increase their chances of capture; although smaller crocodiles were caught by the traps, Gustave was not.

In the last week before being forced to leave the country, the team placed a live goat in the cage. Nothing happened until one night, the camera failed during stormy weather. The next morning, the cage was found partially submerged, and the goat had disappeared. The team speculated that the rising waters helped the goat to escape or that the cage had failed, but without the camera recording, no conclusion could be drawn.

Sightings and possible death 
In 2009, Gustave appeared in the Ruzizi River near Lake Tanganyika.

In a 2019 article about travel in Burundi, a writer for Travel Africa Magazine reported learning that Gustave had been killed. It is not said how he was killed or by whom and no photographic evidence has ever surfaced, leaving these claims dubious until more concrete evidence is brought forward.

In fiction 
Gustave was the basis of the film Primeval (originally titled Gustave).

See also 
 Lolong, the largest crocodile in captivity until his death on February 10, 2013.

References 

Individual crocodiles
Environment of Burundi
Man-eaters
1955 animal births
Individual wild animals